Gilled fungi with laterally-attached fruiting bodies are said to be pleurotoid (Gr.: pleurē + ōtos + -oid, literally "side-ear form" or "having the likeness of Pleurotus ssp.").  Pleurotoid fungi are typically wood-decay fungi and are found on dead and dying trees and coarse woody debris.  The pleurotoid form is polyphyletic, having evolved a number of times within the Basidiomycota.  Many species of pleurotoid fungi are commonly referred to as "oyster" mushrooms.  Laterally-attached fungi with pores rather than gills are referred to as bracket fungi.

Genera

Agaricales
 Cheimonophyllum
 Crepidotus
 Hohenbuehelia
 Hypsizygus
 Ossicaulis
 Panellus
 Phyllotopsis
 Pleurocybella — Angel wings
 Pleurotus — Oyster mushrooms
 Resupinatus — Oysterlings
 Schizophyllum
 Tectella

Polyporales
 Lentinus
 Panus

Russulales
 Lactifluus - some species
 Lentinellus
 Russula - some species

References

External links

Magic Mushrooms Effects & How To Grow Magic Mushrooms Retrieved 2020-10-06.

pleurotoid